OS Andromedae, known also as Nova Andromedae 1986, is a classical nova that appeared in the constellation Andromeda during 1986.   It was discovered at 10:34 UT on 5 December 1986 by Mitsuri Suzuki, a 28-year-old school teacher living in Ena, Japan. He photographed the portion of the Milky Way that passes through northern Andromeda with a 200-mm telephoto lens, and found the nova when its apparent magnitude was 8.0. Two days later it reached a peak apparent visual magnitude of 6.3.

OS Andromedae had an intrinsic decay time (for a three magnitude drop) of 25 days, making it a "fast" nova. A sudden decrease in visual and ultraviolet light, which occurred 30 days after the peak, was due to dust formation during the nova event. The mass of the white dwarf has been estimated to be 1.05  and it was estimated that 3.5  was ejected during the event. The chemical composition is typical of a CO nova.  At the estimated distance of 4.2 kiloparsec, its absolute magnitude at the peak was -7.56.

References

Novae
Andromeda (constellation)
Andromedae, OS